Darian King (born 26 April 1992 in Bridgetown) is a Barbadian tennis player. He has a career-high Association of Tennis Professionals (ATP) singles ranking of world No. 106 achieved on 8 May 2017, and a career-high ATP doubles ranking of No. 156 achieved on 21 October 2019. He has represented Barbados at the Davis Cup and at the 2016 Olympics. His first Grand Slam appearance came at the 2017 US Open, where he lost to fourth seed Alexander Zverev in straight sets.

Personal life
King was born on April 26, 1992 in Bridgetown, Barbados where he currently resides. His father played field hockey and his mother played net ball and died of pancreatic cancer in 2010. He has 3 siblings; 2 brothers and 1 sister. One of the brothers, Christopher, is King's current head coach. He is good friends with many tennis players Frances Tiafoe, Dustin Brown, Noah Rubin, Taylor Townsend, and Sloane Stephens. His favorite athlete is Usain Bolt.

Career

Junior career
King began playing tennis at the age of 8 and grew up idolizing Gaël Monfils, Jo-Wilfried Tsonga, and Dustin Brown (now good friends with King). He played his first junior match in April 2006 at the age of 13 at a grade 4 tournament in Barbados. During his junior career, King made both the singles and doubles draw in 3 of the 4 boys grand slams in 2010 where he failed to make it past the first round once in the singles and made it to the second round twice in the doubles. In one tournament, he defeated future world No. 3 and 2020 US Open champion Dominic Thiem. He ended his junior career with a high ranking of 47 in both the singles and the doubles (both attained on January 4, 2010) and a record of 78–47 in singles and 81–35 in doubles.

Junior Grand Slam results - Singles:

Australian Open: A (-)
French Open: 1R (2010)
Wimbledon: 1R (2010)
US Open: 1R (2010)

Junior Grand Slam results - Doubles:

Australian Open: A (-)
French Open: 2R (2010)
Wimbledon: 2R (2010)
US Open: 1R (2010)

Professional career
King officially turned pro in 2010 at the age of 17. He was considering on playing college tennis at UCLA but made the decision to turn pro instead. Between 2011-2016, King would go on to make 22 ITF futures finals, winning 13 of them. These results would continuously improve his year-end ranking.

In 2014 at the Charlottesville Challenger, King threw his racket at a lineswoman which got him defaulted. The incident went widespread throughout the tennis community and internet.

In 2015 at the Citi Open, King became the first Barbadian to qualify for an ATP event. He lost to Go Soeda in the first round in straight sets.

In 2016, King made his first challenger final at the 2016 Milo Open Cali. In the final, he defeated top seed Victor Estrella Burgos in three sets to win his first challenger title. Two weeks later, he won another challenger title at the 2016 Levene Goulding and Thompson Tennis Challenger defeating Mitchell Krueger in the final in straight sets. Two months later, he would win his third challenger title of the year at the 2016 Tiburon Challenger defeating Michael Mmoh in the final in straight sets. This would also be the year that King played in the 2016 Summer Olympics having been invited to play in the main draw in the singles. He lost to eventual quarterfinalist Steve Johnson in the first round in straight sets.

In 2017, King became the first Barbadian to win an ATP match at the Memphis Open when he won against 5th seed Bernard Tomic in straight sets. He would then follow this up with back to back second round appearances at Indian Wells and the Miami Open, losing to his idol Gaël Monfils in Indian Wells in three sets and to David Goffin in Miami both in straight sets. He reached his career high-ranking of 106 on May 8, 2017. He then went into the 2017 Wimbledon qualifying as 8th send and made it to the qualifying competition before being eliminated by Lukáš Rosol in 4 sets. He qualified for the 2017 US Open for his first and only grand slam. He lost to 4th seed Alexander Zverev in very close straight sets. He finished 2017 with a fourth challenger final at the 2017 Stockton Challenger where he lost to Cameron Norrie in straight sets.

Throughout 2018-2021 his ranking would slowly start to decline. He made two more challenger finals at the 2018 Indian Wells Challenger and the 2019 Orlando Open but lost both. He also made three more qualifying competitions at Grand Slams. Twice at the Australian Open (2018), (2019) and once at the US Open (2019). He would once again lose every single one. He did have some success in doubles, however. In the doubles, he would make 26 ITF futures finals and win 18 of them. In the challenger tour, he made seven challenger finals and won four of them. He's also known for partnering with Peter Polansky on numerous occasions.

During the COVID-19 pandemic in 2020, King underwent wrist surgery which would keep him inactive until February 2021.

Davis Cup
King made his Davis Cup debut in 2009 at the age of 16. During his time with the Barbadian Davis Cup team, he posted a win–loss record of 29–11 in singles, 11–11 in doubles, and 40–22 overall.

Challenger and Futures finals

Singles: 30 (16–14)

Doubles: 33 (22–11)

Performance timelines

Singles
Current through the 2022 Davis Cup.

Record against other players
King's match record against those who have been ranked in the top 10, with those who have been ranked No. 1 in boldface. ATP Tour matches and qualifying matches, ATP Challenger Tour matches and qualifying matches, ITF Tour matches and qualifying matches, and Davis Cup all count on record.

  Marcos Baghdatis 1–1
  David Goffin 0–1
  Jürgen Melzer 0–1
  Gaël Monfils 0–1
  Alexander Zverev 0–1
  Lucas Pouille 0–2

* .

References

External links
 
 
 

1992 births
Living people
Barbadian male tennis players
Sportspeople from Bridgetown
Tennis players at the 2016 Summer Olympics
Olympic tennis players of Barbados
Tennis players at the 2015 Pan American Games
Pan American Games competitors for Barbados
Tennis players at the 2010 Summer Youth Olympics
Tennis players at the 2011 Pan American Games
Tennis players at the 2010 Commonwealth Games
Tennis players at the 2019 Pan American Games
Commonwealth Games competitors for Barbados